Gučevo is a mountain in western Serbia.

Gučevo may also refer to:

 Gučevo (Rogatica), a village in Bosnia and Herzegovina
 FK Loznica, formerly Gučevo football club

See also
Gusevogoroskoye mine, Russia